Codariocalyx motorius (though often placed in Desmodium), known as the telegraph plant,  dancing plant, or semaphore plant, is a tropical Asian shrub in the Pea Family (Fabaceae), one of a few plants capable of rapid movement; others include Mimosa pudica, the venus flytrap and Utricularia.  The motion occurs in daylight hours when the temperature is above 72 degrees Fahrenheit.  Many sources claim that the two leaflets move on a common axis (like the blades of a kayak paddle) even though there is no rigid connection between them.

It is widely distributed throughout Bangladesh, Bhutan, Cambodia, China, India, Indonesia, Laos, Malaysia, Myanmar, Nepal, Pakistan, Sri Lanka, Taiwan, Thailand and Vietnam. It can even be found on the Society Islands, a remote chain of islands in the South Pacific. It produces small, purple flowers. 
This plant has small, lateral leaflets which move at speeds rapid enough to be perceivable with the naked eye. This is possibly a strategy to maximise light by tracking the sun. Each leaf is equipped with a hinge that permits it to be moved to receive more sunlight, but the weight of these leaves means the plant must expend a lot of energy in moving it. To optimise its movement, each large leaf has two small leaflets at its base. These move constantly along an elliptical path, sampling the intensity of sunlight, and directing the large leaf to the area of most intensity. Another hypothesis has been offered that the rapid movements are intended to deter potential predators. It has also been suggested that these movements may be a form of butterfly mimicry to prevent the laying of butterfly eggs on the plant's leaves.

The common name is due to the rotation of the leaflets with a period of about three to five minutes; this was likened to a semaphore telegraph, a structure with adjustable paddles that could be seen from a distance, the position of which conveyed a message in semaphore, hence the common names.

The plant is described in detail in Charles Darwin's 1880 The Power of Movement in Plants.

Usage
Due to its special characteristic that it can "dance", the plant has been used as ornament in gardening, in which some are made as bonsais.

Apart from ornamental value, the plant also has medical value, due to its leaves, stems and roots containing small amounts of tryptamine alkaloids, especially DMT and 5-MeO-DMT.

References

External links 
 Trout’s Notes on the Genus Desmodium Chemistry, ethnomedicine, pharmacology, synonyms and miscellany (pdf)
 

Desmodieae
Flora of Asia